Ramcharitra Rambhajan Singh (died 10 February 2022), commonly known as R.R. Singh, was an Indian politician from Indian National Congress, who served as the Mayor of Mumbai from 1993 to 1994. He died on 10 February 2022, at the age of 86. He was a North Indian face in Maharashtra's politics.

Early life 
He started working as a tabela (cow shed) worker in Mumbai's suburban. He grew as a politician under the guidance of Dina Bama Patil, a trade union leader and legislator.

Political career  
He was elected as a corporator in the BMC poll for the first time in 1973. He was a corporator for 29 years, from 1973 until 2002. He was a member of the statutory standing committee twice, between 1991 and 1992. From 1993-1994, RR Singh served as the Mayor of Mumbai when the Indian National Congress was in power in Brihanmumbai Municipal Corporation. He was also a member of BEST Health Committees and the founder and Chairman of Mulund-based R.R. Educational Trust.

In January 2003, he was disqualified as the caste certificate he submitted for contesting the civic elections from Mulund in February 2002 was found to be fake. Singh was arrested in the same case in March 2003 and later released on bail.

See also 
 List of mayors of Mumbai

References 

2022 deaths
Mayors of Mumbai
Maharashtra municipal councillors
Indian National Congress politicians from Maharashtra
Indian National Congress politicians
People from Mumbai
People from Uttar Pradesh